Robot Cache, S.L. is a video game company established to allow for digital buying and selling of video games. It was founded in January 2018 by Brian Fargo, and reached open beta in May 2020.

Aimed to be a direct competitor to Steam, the digital storefront from Valve, Robot Cache differs allows users to sell games through the service's encrypted blockchain, reducing the cost of operating the storefront. It is backed by a new cryptocurrency, IRON, which sellers mine or receive and can use to purchase games alongside real-world funds.

History
Robot Cache was founded in January 2018 by Brian Fargo, the founder of InXile Entertainment. Lee Jacobson serves at the chief executive officer, and Mark Caldwell as the chief technology officer. Laura Naviaux Sturr, formerly of Daybreak, was CMO and COO in 2018 and 2019, leaving for Amazon Game Studios.

Robot Cache planned on a  initial coin offering.

In December 2019, AMD joined the platform.

On May 12, 2020, Robot Cache launched as an open beta.

References

External links
 

Internet properties established in 2018
Online-only retailers of video games